R (Bancoult) v Secretary of State for Foreign and Commonwealth Affairs (No 3) [2018] UKSC 3 is a 2018 legal case concerning the admissibility of a leaked Wikileaks cable as evidence in a dispute over the legality of a marine protected area in the British Indian Ocean Territory.

References

External links
(Bancoult No 3)

Chagos Archipelago sovereignty dispute
Supreme Court of the United Kingdom cases